Hindkowans, also known as the Hindki, is a contemporary designation for speakers of Indo-Aryan languages who live among the neighbouring Pashtuns, particularly the speakers of various Hindko dialects of Lahnda (western Punjabi dialects). The origins of the term refer merely to "Indian speaking" people (i.e. speakers of Indo-Aryan languages) rather than to any particular ethnic group. The term is not only applied to several forms of "Northern Lahnda" but also to the Saraiki dialects of the districts of Dera Ghazi Khan, Mianwali, and Dera Ismail Khan, which border the southern Pashto-speaking areas.

There is also a small diaspora in Afghanistan, which includes members of the Sikh and Hindu community who became established there during the Sikh Empire in the first half of the 19th century. Most of them have emigrated since the rise of the Taliban, and the total population of Sikhs, Hindko-speaking or not, was estimated at around 300 families (as of 2018). They are commonly known as Hindki.

Those Hindko speakers, mainly Hindu and Sikhs, who after the partition of India migrated to the independent republic, occasionally identify with the broader Punjabi community; since Hindko is little known and reside the Indian states of Punjab and Jammu & Kashmir.

Prior to the partition of India, the Hindu and Sikh Hindkowans exercised urban economic power in the North-West Frontier Province of colonial India. They were primarily traders and merchants and over time, settled in areas as far as Kalat, Balochistan.

Origin 
The word "Hindko" is a collective label for a diverse group of Lahnda (Western Punjabi) dialects of very different groups, not all of which are even geographically contiguous, spoken by people of various ethnic backgrounds in several areas in Pakistan, primarily in the provinces of Khyber Pakhtunkhwa and Punjab. The term "Hindko" is a Pashto word most commonly taken to have originally meant "the Indian language" or "language of Hind", but it has developed to denote the Indo-Aryan speech forms spoken in the northern Indian subcontinent, in contrast to the neighbouring Pashto, an Iranic language.

Social setting 

There is no generic name for the speakers of Hindko because they belong to diverse ethnic groups and tend to identify themselves by the larger families or castes. However, the Hindko-speaking community belonging to the Hazara Division of Khyber Pakhtunkhwa are sometimes recognised collectively as Hazarewal. A portion of Hindko speakers in the Hazara Division claim Pashtun ancestry. Some of those speak Hindko as their mother tongue while others as a second language. These include the Tahirkhelis, Yusufzais, Jadoons and Tareens. The other Hindko speakers include the Sayyids, Awans, Mughals, Malik, Raja, kumar, khatri, sethi,  Tanolis, Swatis, Turks, Qureshis and Gujjars.

The most common second language for Hindko-speakers in Pakistan is Urdu and the second most common one is Pashto. In most Hindko-speaking areas, speakers of Pashto live in the same or neighbouring communities (although this is less true in Abbottabad and Kaghan Valley). The relationship between Hindko and its neighbours is not one of stable bilingualism. In terms of domains of use and number of speakers, Hindko is dominant and growing in the north-east; in Hazara for example, it is displacing Pashto as the language in use among the few Swatis that speak it, and in the Neelam Valley of Azad Jammu & Kashmir it is gaining ground at the expense of the minority languages like Kashmiri. In the cities of Kohat and Peshawar, on the other hand, it is Hindko that is in a weaker position. With the exodus of the Hindko-speaking Hindus and Sikhs after partition and the consequent influx of Pashtuns into the vacated areas of the urban economy, there have been signs of a shift towards Pashto.

Notable Hindko-speakers 

Ahmad Faraz
Ali Khan Jadoon
Anwar Shamim
Asghar Khan
Ayub Khan
Azam Khan Swati
Baba Haider Zaman
Bashir Ahmad Bilour
Bashir Jehangiri
Dilip Kumar, stage name for Yusuf Khan
Firdous Jamal
Gohar Ayub Khan
Ghulam Ahmad Bilour
Haider Zaman Khan
Imran Ashraf
Iqbal Zafar Jhagra
 Jalal Baba
Mehtab Abbasi
Mohammad Abdul Ghafoor Hazarvi
Mulk Raj Anand
Murtaza Javed Abbasi
Omar Ayub Khan
Qateel Shifai
Raj Kapoor
Sardar Zahoor Ahmad
Sardar Muhammad Yousuf
Salahuddin Tirmizi
Shibli Faraz
Vinod Khanna
Yasir Hameed
Zahirul Islam Abbasi

See also 
 Hazarewal
 Tribes and clans of the Pothohar Plateau
 Pahari people (Kashmir)
 Farsiwans

Notes and references

Bibliography 

Hindkowan people
Punjabi people
Indo-Aryan peoples
Ethnic groups in Pakistan
Hindkowan tribes